is a passenger railway station in the city of Yūki, Ibaraki Prefecture, Japan, operated by East Japan Railway Company (JR East).

Lines
Yūki Station is served by the Mito Line, and is located 6.6 km from the official starting point of the line at Oyama Station.

Station layout
The station has an elevated station building with one side platform and one island platform. The station has a Midori no Madoguchi ticket office.

Platforms

History
Yūki Station was opened on 16 January 1889.  The station was absorbed into the JR East network upon the privatization of the Japanese National Railways (JNR) on 1 April 1987. The station building was rebuilt as part of an urban renewal program in 1994.

Passenger statistics
In fiscal 2019, the station was used by an average of 2041 passengers daily (boarding passengers only).

Surrounding area
 Yūki City Hall
 Yūki Post Office

See also
 List of railway stations in Japan

References

External links

  JR East Station Information 

Railway stations in Ibaraki Prefecture
Mito Line
Railway stations in Japan opened in 1889
Yūki, Ibaraki